The South Staffordshire County League, formerly known as the "Staffordshire Club Cricket Championship", is the main cricket league in South Staffordshire.

History
The league's history goes back to 1973, and it has acted as a feeder league to the Birmingham and District Premier League since 1999. Currently, at the end of each season, the Premier Division winners enter into the play offs against the winners of the Shropshire, Warickshire and Worcestershire County Leagues for a place in the BDCPL 2nd division. 

Division 1 Champions

1975: Fordhouses
1976: Little Stoke
1977: Little Stoke
1978: Cannock
1979: Fordhouses
1980: Fordhouses
1981: Fordhouses
1982: Wombourne
1983: Wightwick
1984: Fordhouses
1985: Cannock
1986: Himley
1987: Wombourne
1988: Himley
1989: Penn
1990: Penn
1991: Cannock & Rugeley
1992: Cannock & Rugeley
1993: Cannock & Rugeley
1994: Penn
1995: Fordhouses
1996: Fordhouses
1997: Penn
1998: Fordhouses

Since 1999 the winner of the Staffordshire Club Cricket Championship has been promoted to the Birmingham and District Premier League

1999: Penkridge
2000: Wheaton Aston
2001: Wednesbury
2002: Beacon
2003: Lichfield
2004: Beacon
2005: Wombourne
2006: Old Wulfs Tettenhall
2007: Lichfield
2008: Milford Hall
2009: Brewood
2010: Wednesbury
2011: Penkridge
2012: Milford Hall
2013: Hawkins
2014: Pelsall
2015: Lichfield
2016: Milford Hall
2017: Pelsall
2018: Beacon
2019: Pelsall
2020: Milford Hall finished top of the Premier Division during a season shortened by the COVID-19 pandemic.
2021: Lichfield
2022: Tamworth

External links
Official League Website

English domestic cricket competitions
Cricket in Staffordshire